Rangbaaz is an Indian web series set against the rustic background of the Gorakhpur in the 1990s. It was released as a ZEE5 original on 22 December 2018. In October 2019, ZEE5 renewed the show for a second season, Rangbaaz Phirse, which premiered on 20 December 2019. 
Season three of Rangbaaz title Rangbaaz: Darr Ki Rajneeti premiered on ZEE5 on 29 July 2022.

Synopsis
Season 1

Rangbaaz is based on the true story of Shri Prakash Shukla (Shiv Prakash Shukla in the series), who was a notorious gangster and the most wanted criminal of Gorakhpur, Uttar Pradesh. The series shows his journey from a DDU student to becoming the second most wanted criminal in India. Other characters related to Shree Prakash's life include Ram Shankar Tiwari, inspired by Hari Shankar Tiwari, and Chandra Bhan Singh, inspired by Suraj Bhan Singh (former MP from Mokama, Bihar).

Season 2

Rangbaaz Phir Se is inspired from the life of Anandpal Singh (name changed to Amarpal Singh) who was a gangster active in the state of Rajasthan. The series chronicles his rise to becoming the most wanted criminal in the history of Rajasthan. The story also covers his business of illicit liquor, his rivalry with Gopal Phogawat (name changed to Raja Phogat), and his dynamics with the political leadership of the state.

Season 3

Rangbaaz: Darr Ki Rajneeti Season 3 has premiered on 29 July 2022 on ZEE5 starring  Vineet Kumar Singh and Aakanksha Singh. The story of the main character is supposedly based on a Gangster turned politician Mohammad Shahabuddin.

Cast

Season 1 

 Saqib Saleem as Shiv Prakash Shukla (inspired by Shri Prakash Shukla).
 Tigmanshu Dhulia as Ram Shankar Tiwari (inspired by Hari Shankar Tiwari).
 Ranvir Shorey as Sidharth Pandey - Special Task Force Lead
 Aahana Kumra as Babita Sharma
 Jay Saumik Joshi as Abhishek
 Ravi Kishan as Chandra Bhan Singh (inspired by Surajbhan Singh)
 Arun Kalra as Narendra Shahi (inspired by Virendra Shahi)
 Chandan Anand as Ranjan Tiwari
 Pawan Chopra  as Director General of Police - UP
 Bharat Chawla as  Sushant
 Saurabh Goyal as  Host of India's Most Wanted (inspired by Suhaib Ilyasi)
 Gaurav Mishra  as Munna Shukla
 Ankur B. Saraiya as  Bangkok Goon
 Daya Shankar Pandey as Mahavir
 Ajay Singh as Morena Vidhayak
 Atul Pandey as Tanuj Pratap Singh

Season 2 / Rangbaaz Phirse 

 Jimmy Shergill  as Amar Pal Singh (inspired by Anandpal Singh)
 Sharad Kelkar as Raja Phogat
  Mohammed Zeeshan Ayyub as Sanjay Singh Meena
 Mahima Makwana as Vaishali 'Chiku' Singh, Amar Pal's daughter
 Gul Panag as Anupriya (inspired by Anuradha Chaudhary)
 Sushant Singh as Jai Ram Godara (inspired by Jeevan Godara)
 Harsh Chhaya as Sundar Singh Chauhan
 Chetan Pandit as Home Minister Ahlawat 
 Amit Sial as Balram Rathi (inspired by balvir banuda)
 Spruha Joshi as Rukmini, wife of Amar Pal
 Sonam Arora as Madhu Godavari, wife of Jai Ram
 Ujjwal Chopra as Harjiram

Season 3 / Rangbaaz Dar ki Raajneeti
Third season of the show is set to premiere on ZEE5 platform on 29 July 2022. The season's story is loosely based on Gangster turned politician Mohammad Shahabuddin from Bihar.
 Viineet Kumar  as Shah Ali Baig: Sana's husband
 Aakanksha Singh as Sana: Shah Ali Baig's wife
 Vijay Maurya
 Prashant Narayanan
 Rajesh Tailang
 Geetanjali Kulkarni
 Prateek Srivastava
Teetu Verma as Dinesh Singh

Episodes

Season 1

Season 2 / Rangbaaz Phirse

Sequel Spin-off 
After the successful run of first season, ZEE5 announced a spin-off sequel for the show, titled "Rangbaaz Phirse"

Reception

Rangbaaz
The New Indian Express rated with 3/5 stars  and critically reviewed the series by saying it had nothing out of the ordinary about the crime and criminals story. The lead actor performed well in his role as a gangster in making. The film relied so much on the film songs of the era to create a particular mood for the storyline which was a bit tiresome.

Rangbaaz Phirse
Binged gave a rating of 6/10 stars to Rangbaaz Phirse and critically reviewed the actors performances. They also stated that the series fails to display a larger than life gangster profile. Moreover, the direction of the series makes it look quite authentic when capturing expressions and other important scenes. Throughout the nine episodes the rise and fall of its protagonist is portrayed dramatically in impressive detail.

Hindustan Times gave a review about the series saying that the webseries focuses on the rural heartlands plagued by the caste hierarchy. The storyline revolves around gruesome tit-for-tat that leads to numerous murders involving bystanders, politicians and cops, serving their own agendas. The cast in the film gave great performances and did justice to their roles.

References

External links 
Rangbaaz on ZEE5
 

Indian web series
2018 web series debuts
ZEE5 original programming
Action web series
Crime thriller web series